The 1995 Eastern Michigan Eagles football team represented Eastern Michigan University in the 1995 NCAA Division I-A football season. In their first season under head coach Rick Rasnick, the Eagles compiled a 6–5 record (5–3 against conference opponents), finished in fifth place in the Mid-American Conference, and outscored their opponents, 363 to 335. The team's statistical leaders included Charlie Batch with 3,177 passing yards, Savon Edwards with 732 rushing yards, and Steve Clay with 999 receiving yards. Batch went on to play 15 years in the National Football League.

Schedule

References

Eastern Michigan
Eastern Michigan Eagles football seasons
Eastern Michigan Eagles football